The Germany national football team played its first international match on 5 April 1908 during the era of the German Empire, losing 5–3 to Switzerland in Basel. The team has been one of the most successful national sides in world football. They won the World Cup in 1954, 1974, 1990 and 2014, as well as the European Championship in 1972, 1980 and 1996. In doing so, twenty of its players have won both titles, and six have won gold, silver and bronze medals at the World Cup. Lothar Matthäus has played in a record 25 World Cup matches, and his participation in five World Cup tournaments is a joint record, shared with Antonio Carbajal of Mexico. Miroslav Klose is the highest goalscorer in the tournament's history with 16 goals, while Gerd Müller is third with 14. Former team captain Franz Beckenbauer is one of only three men to win the World Cup as a player and as a manager. German goalkeeper Bodo Illgner became the first ever goalkeeper to keep a clean sheet in the final of a FIFA World Cup in 1990. Oliver Kahn won the golden ball award at the 2002 World Cup, thus becoming the only goalkeeper in the history of the competition to be selected as the best player of the tournament.

Matthäus was the inaugural winner of the FIFA World Player of the Year award in 1991, and is one of five Germany players to have been awarded Ballon d'Or; two of which, Franz Beckenbauer and Karl-Heinz Rummenigge, have each won the award twice. Beckenbauer was also voted in eighth place for the FIFA Player of the Century award, and was selected for the World Team of the 20th Century. Ten German players were named in the FIFA 100,  a list of the 125 greatest living footballers chosen by former footballer Pelé, and ten are in the FIFA Century Club, having earned 100 or more caps. Lothar Matthäus's 150 international appearances make him the ninth-most capped player in world football, and Miroslav Klose's 71 goals is the eleventh-most of any international player.

Former captains of the national team may be awarded the title of honorary captain by the German Football Association. To date, six former players of the men's team have received this award: Fritz Walter (1958), Uwe Seeler (1972), Franz Beckenbauer (1982), Lothar Matthäus (2001), Jürgen Klinsmann (2016) and Philipp Lahm (2017).

In total, 951 players have represented the Germany national team. This list covers players with twenty or more caps for the national team organised by the German Football Association, including West Germany. The players are initially ordered by number of caps (in descending order), then by alphabetical order of surname. All statistics are correct up to and including the match played on 13 October 2020 against Switzerland.

Selection history

War and the political situation of Germany in the 20th century had an impact on the country's borders, as well as the make-up of the German football team. Germany played 30 internationals until the outbreak of the World War I, with the last match occurring on 5 April 1914 against the Netherlands. During the war, no internationals were played. In the new Weimar Republic, the team played its first post-war match on 27 June 1920 against Switzerland. Only six players that appeared before World War I returned to the post-war side: Otto Harder, Adolf Jäger, Eduard Pendorf, Hans Schmidt, Josef Schümmelfelder and Karl Wolter. After the Nazis came to power in January 1933, players of Jewish origin were banned from the team. Due to the annexation of Austria in 1938, the Austrian team was absorbed into the German team, resulting in the inclusion of several Austrians in Germany's squad at the 1938 World Cup. With the outbreak of World War II, Germany did not cease to play internationals, but was limited to facing neutral, allied and puppet states. The country played 35 internationals during the war, its last on 22 November 1942 against Slovakia.

After World War II and the team's reinstatement into FIFA, the German Football Association (DFB) was in charge of football in the Federal Republic and West Berlin. During this period, the team was commonly referred to as West Germany. The team played its first post-war international on 22 November 1950 against Switzerland. Only four players selected before the war were capped for the nation afterwards: Herbert Burdenski, Andreas Kupfer, Jakob Streitle and Fritz Walter. Due to the break-up of Germany, two breakaway national teams were formed: Saarland (in 1950) and East Germany (in 1952). Franz Immig of Saarland was the only player in either team to have been previously capped for Germany. Saarland played their final match in 1956, after which control of the Saar Protectorate was given to West Germany. Three of the Saar team's players later represented Germany: Karl Ringel, Gerhard Siedl and Heinz Vollmar. Upon Germany's reunification in 1990, the East Germany.. team was reintegrated into the Germany national team. Eight players capped for East Germany later appeared for the reunified team: Thomas Doll, Ulf Kirsten, Olaf Marschall, Matthias Sammer, Heiko Scholz, Dirk Schuster, Andreas Thom, Dariusz Wosz.

Key

Players

See also
List of Germany international footballers (5–19 caps)
List of Germany international footballers (1–4 caps)
List of Germany international footballers born outside Germany
List of East Germany international footballers
List of Saarland international footballers

References

General references

External links
Player list from DFB 
All-time appearances at WorldFootball.net
Germany national team caps at EU-Football.info

 
Association football player non-biographical articles